Freddie Mercury: The Great Pretender is an Emmy/Rose d'Or award-winning 2012 feature-length documentary film about Queen singer Freddie Mercury and his attempt to forge a solo career. The film is a British venture co-produced by EMP and Mercury Songs for Eagle Rock Entertainment with Eagle Rock serving as distributor.

Directed by Rhys Thomas and produced by Jim (Miami) Beach, Rhys Thomas and Joss Crowley. The documentary premiered on BBC One in edited form as part of the Imagine series, and later the Director's Cut was shown on BBC Four.  It gained 3.5 million viewers when aired on BBC One in October 2012 and a further 1.2 million when shown on BBC Four.

Production

Development
Produced and directed by Rhys Thomas, a lifelong Queen fan and expert. Thomas focused on archive material of Mercury, going back to 1976 in search of footage to show the story of Mercury's life, career and the solo projects including the Mr. Bad Guy album, he had worked on outside of Queen. The producer, editor and director of photography behind the 2011 BBC documentary Queen: Days of Our Lives.

Release
The film was exclusively broadcast on the British television channel BBC One on 16 October 2012 at 10:35pm in England and Scotland and 11:05pm in Wales and Northern Ireland with an edited version of 65 minutes.
The documentary coincided with the release of the new Barcelona Special Edition album with Mercury and Caballé's original album re-recorded with a full 80-piece orchestra (a feature on the making of this album is included on both formats) and a new book, also entitled The Great Pretender, with matching artwork.

Marketing
On 6 September 2012 the official trailer was released on YouTube by Eagle Rock Entertainment.

Home media
The Great Pretender was released on DVD, Blu-ray and digital download through Eagle Vision Media on 24 September 2012. It was released in the United States on 25 September from Eagle Rock Entertainment. The length of the film on home media is approximately 1 hour 47 minutes. All formats include the extended version that was not aired on BBC One. The bonus features added on DVD and Blu-ray are "Freddie Mercury Goes Solo" a seven-minute interview, an extended seven-minute interview with Montserrat Caballé and a five-minute documentary the Making Barcelona: Special Edition 2012.

The film debuted at #3 on the Official UK Music Video Chart on 30 September 2012, based on sales of DVDs and other physical formats.

Broadcasts
After the original BBC One broadcast in October, an extended director's cut aired on BBC Four on 29 and 30 December 2012 and then on BBC Four HD at 11:00pm on 5 January 2013. The director's cut features 25 minutes of extra footage. It was also aired in Australia on ABC2 in December 2012 with it being aired again in 2018 on SBS due to the release of the biographical film Bohemian Rhapsody. The documentary was broadcast on British television channel Pick on 20 April 2019 to coincide with the 27th anniversary of The Freddie Mercury Tribute Concert.

Reception

Critical response

Sarah Rainey for The Telegraph wrote "with so much of Mercury’s career already explored, and legions of Queen fans attending sell-out We Will Rock You performances in the West End (now in its 10th year), it is difficult to tread new ground. But Yentob’s affectionate tribute captured Mercury in a new light.", giving it a rating of 3/5 stars. Guardian critic Caroline Sullivan said "In the BBC programme – its title taken from a 1987 solo single – Mercury emerges as anything but boring. Skittish, exasperating and endearing, yes, but never dull.

Awards and nominations

Charts

References

BBC television documentaries
Documentary films about singers
Freddie Mercury
International Emmy Award for Best Arts Programming winners